Kuruthi Aattam is an 2022 Indian Tamil-language action thriller film written and directed by Sri Ganesh. The film features Atharvaa and Priya Bhavani Shankar in the lead roles with Radhika Sarathkumar, Radha Ravi in supporting role. The film was first announced in April 2017 and began production in August 2018. The film was anticipated to release in June 2020 before the COVID-19 pandemic, but it was postponed. The film was scheduled to release on 24 December 2021 but got postponed due to legal issues.

The film was released theatrically on 5 August 2022, where it received mixed reviews from critics and audience.

Premise
Shakthivel is an attender in a government hospital and a Kabaddi player in Madurai, who befriends Muthu, the son of mafia kingpin Gandhimati, by defending him in a scuffle. However, Shakthi earns the wrath of Arivu, Muthu's friend and the son of Gandhimati's close-aid Durai, which makes him to kill Shakthi. When Muthu is murdered, Shakthi is driven by vengeance which leads him to a gang-war. How does Shakthi avenges Muthu's death forms the rest of the plot.

Cast 
Atharvaa as Shakthivel "Shakthi"
Priya Bhavani Shankar as Vennila
Radha Ravi as Durai
Radhika Sarathkumar as Gandhimathi
Vatsan Chakravarthy as Sethu
Vinod Sagar
Kanna Ravi as Muthu
Prakash Raghavan as Arivu
Bala Hasan

Production 
In April 2017, days after the release of his directorial debut 8 Thottakkal, Sri Ganesh announced that his next film would star Atharvaa in the lead role. As a result of the actor's busy schedule, the film was kept on hold for a year, with Ganesh using the break to develop the script of the film. Produced by Rock Fort Entertainment, the film was officially launched in August 2018, with Ganesh stating that the film would tell the tale of gangsters based in Madurai. Veteran actors Radhika Sarathkumar and Radharavi joined the cast to play siblings during the first schedule, while Priya Bhavani Shankar was confirmed as the film's lead actress during the following month. Before signing on, Priya requested the director to rework the script to add to the value of her character in the film. Music composer Yuvan Shankar Raja also agreed to join the project during the same period. The film began its shoot in September 2018.

Music
The film's music is composed by Yuvan Shankar Raja.

Release

Theatrical 
The film was released theatrically on 5 August 2022.

Home Media
The post-theatrical streaming rights of the film was bought by Aha Tamil while the Satellite Rights were sold to Colors Tamil.  The film had its digital premiere on 2 September 2022.

Reception
Lokesh Balachandran of The Times of India gave the film's rating 3 out of 5 stars and stated that "Overall, Kuruthi Aattam is a decent action entertainer which could have done really well with better writing in the second half." Srinivasa Ramanujam of The Hindu after reviewing the film stated that "With Kuruthi Aattam, the film’s director Sri Ganesh shows another glimpse into that promise, but packs in too many elements to keep us glued to the screen." Sudhir Srinivasan of Cinema Express gave the film 3.5 out of 5 stars, stating that "Kuruthi Attam is a bunch of angry, yelling men, running at each other brandishing aruvaas. Moviecrow gave the film’s rating 2.5 out of 5, stating that "Kuruthi Aattam is definitely a bit disappointing, to put it mildly. Otherwise, it is a generic film that remains watchable but one that becomes tiring by the end." Kirubhakar Purushothaman of The Indian Express gave the film 3.5 out of 5 stars and stated "Two things work majorly in Kuruthi Aattam. One is the brilliantly-written character of Arivu, backed by a commendable performance by Prakash Raghavan. He instantly makes you hate the character, and that makes us look forward to him getting his due. Secondly, the bromance between Sakthivel and Muthu is heartwarming." Thinkal Menon of OTT Play rated the film 3 out of 5 stars and wrote that "As the title suggests, Kuruthi Aattam involves numerous murders, complicated assassination plans, aggressive rivalry and revenge-seeking men and women. The director manages to hold the attention of the viewers to a decent extent despite a few flaws."

References 

2022 films
2020s Tamil-language films
Indian action thriller films
Films scored by Yuvan Shankar Raja
2022 action thriller films